Little Fisher River is a  long 4th order tributary to the Fisher River in Surry County, North Carolina. This is the only stream of this name in the United States.

Variant names
According to the Geographic Names Information System, it has also been known historically as:
Little Fish River
Little Fishe River

Course
Little Fisher River rises on the south side of the Blue Ridge Escarpment about 0.5 miles southwest of Fisher Peak.  Little Fisher River then flows generally south to join the Fisher River about 0.5 miles southwest of New Hope, North Carolina.

Watershed
Little Fisher River drains  of area, receives about 48.5 in/year of precipitation, has a wetness index of 336.03, and is about 56% forested.

See also
List of rivers of North Carolina

References

Rivers of North Carolina
Rivers of Surry County, North Carolina